Adotela is a genus of beetles in the family Carabidae, containing the following species:

 Adotela apicalis (Sloane, 1893)
 Adotela atronitens Sloane, 1890
 Adotela australis Sloane, 1890 
 Adotela bicolor (Castelnau, 1867)
 Adotela carbonaria (Castelnau, 1867)
 Adotela carenoides Putzeys, 1873
 Adotela concolor Castelnau, 1867
 Adotela esmeralda Castelnau, 1867
 Adotela frenchi Sloane, 1890
 Adotela grandis (Castelnau, 1867)
 Adotela howitti (Castelnau, 1867)
 Adotela laevigatta (Sloane, 1893)
 Adotela nigerrima MacLeay, 1873 
 Adotela noctis (Sloane, 1893)
 Adotela striolata Putzeys, 1873
 Adotela violacea (Castelnau, 1867)
 Adotela viridis (MacLeay, 1871)

References

Broscini
Carabidae genera